The San Jose Fire Department (SJFD) provides firefighting, rescue and emergency medical services to the city of San Jose, California, United States. The San Jose Fire Department protects the third largest city in California (after Los Angeles and San Diego) and the tenth largest city in the nation.

Coverage
The San Jose Fire Department's jurisdiction covers San Jose’s incorporated city limits and unincorporated areas of the County of Santa Clara totaling approximately 180 square miles and 1.2 million residents. SJFD is the emergency service provider for a number of high-hazard occupancies, including an International Airport; a municipal airport; 7 major hospitals (including 3 trauma centers, and 7 emergency departments); the SAP Center, home of the NHL San Jose Sharks, (maximum occupancy 20,000); San Jose State University (the oldest public institution of higher education on the West Coast), student population of 31,906; three regional super malls; and over 108 high-rise structures.

Call Volume
The San Jose Fire Department responded to 94,500 incidents in Fiscal Year 2017-2018. This included 3,500 fires and 7,000 rescue, HazMat, USAR and other non-fire related emergencies. The remaining 61% were medical related emergencies.

Services
The San Jose Fire Department is an “all risk” department meaning that it has the trained personnel and equipment to mitigate a variety of emergencies, and provides a wide array of emergency services and support services throughout the city. These include the following:

•	Fire Suppression: Firefighters and fire apparatus that respond to extinguish fires of all types, including structure fires, vehicle fires, and vegetation fires and other fires.

•	Advanced Life Support (ALS): All San Jose Fire Engine Companies and Truck Companies have firefighters trained to provide specialized medical care (unless, of course, they are marked out BLS for the entire shift). All firefighters are Emergency Medical Technicians. Some are EMT-Paramedics, meaning they have the special training and skills to treat patients with drugs, to intubate patients who are not breathing, to gain intravenous access, to provide defibrillation to patients in cardiac arrest, and a variety of other medical services.

•	Urban Search and Rescue (USAR): Rescue teams are prepared to handle Confined Space, Low-Angle, High-Angle, Trench, Swift-water, Open water, Flood, Collapse and a variety of other technical rescues. Several department USAR members also serve on the FEMA Urban Search and Rescue Task Force, Urban Search and Rescue California Task Force 3. The San Jose Fire Department USAR team has been certified as a Type I resource, the highest level of USAR capability.

•	Hazardous Materials (HazMat): A Hazardous Incident Team is trained to the HazMat Specialist level to identify hazardous materials using technical test procedures and contain, neutralize or otherwise mitigate dangerous gases, liquids or solids. The San Jose Fire Department HazMat team has been certified as a Type I resource, the highest level of HazMat capability.

•	Aircraft Rescue and Firefighting: The department provides airplane crash fire suppression and rescue services by a specially equipped and trained crew based at the Norman Mineta San Jose International Airport.

•	Fire Prevention: Firefighters and Fire Prevention Inspectors help ensure schools, businesses, and multi-occupancy dwellings follow fire safety codes and are safe for residents. While on emergency incidents such as medical calls, firefighters routinely check for smoke detectors and offer detectors or replace batteries.

•	The Arson Unit: Responsible for investigating the origin and cause of fires. The unit is staffed by Investigators who are cross-trained as law enforcement officers with powers of arrest. Personnel in the unit are designated peace officers under California Penal Code Section 830.37(a).

•	Public Education: Firefighters meet with the public to do home safety inspections, teach families about “Exit Drills in the Home,” teach fire safety techniques such as “Stop, Drop and Roll” in schools, and distribute fire or home safety literature. Some times the firefighters will do open houses at some of their fire stations.

•	Emergency Preparedness: The Fire Department’s firefighters work with the public to encourage basic preparedness for routine or major catastrophes.

Operations
The San Jose Fire Department currently operates out of 33 fire stations located throughout the city, organized into five battalions. Each battalion is commanded by a Battalion Chief.

Engines, Trucks, Rescue Medics and Battalion apparatus are staffed throughout the year. Some Wildland apparatus are not staffed during summer months. Under "Other", vans, utilities, reserve engines, air units, fire support units, rescue units, USAR trailers, and the USAR boat are unstaffed - personnel from Engines, Trucks and Rescue Medics staff those apparatus when they are needed to respond. Wildland engines are prefaced with a "6" to indicate they are Type VI engines based on the National Wildfire Coordinating Group rating criteria.

In November 2018, San Jose voters passed ballot measure T. This measure provides bond funds to support the building and repair of critical city infrastructure. Some of the projects planned for Measure T funds include construction of a new fire station in the Willow Glen neighborhood (Fire Station 37 at Lincoln Ave. and Curtner Ave.), rebuilding Fire Stations 8 and 23, and building two additional new stations. During calendar 2019, the city will adopt a new 5-year fire department infrastructure plan, which will include the timing for building and staffing those stations.

Organization
The San Jose Fire Department is organized into five bureaus of operations: the Bureau of Administrative Services (BAS), the Bureau of Field Operations (BFO), the Bureau of EMS and Training (BET), the Bureau of Support Services (BSS), and the Bureau of Fire Prevention (BFP). Fire Communications is under BFO and is staffed by non-sworn Fire Department dispatchers. These highly-skilled dispatchers meet or exceed the criteria required for the SJFD Communications Center to be nationally accredited.

Battalion 1

Battalion 2

Battalion 5

Battalion 10

Battalion 13

Early History 
El Pueblo of San Jose (the Town of San Jose) was protected by volunteer firemen with the founding of the Pueblo in 1777. It wasn't until 1854 that these volunteer bucket brigades would transform into the official San Jose Fire Department, labeled the San Jose Hook and Ladder Co. No. 1.

Originally consisting of volunteer firefighters in its infancy, the San Jose Fire Department (SJFD) was formally established by the city of San Jose on the 27th of January, 1854, with the formation of the San Jose Hook and Ladder Co. No. 1.  The San Jose Fire Department has since been in service for over 165 years and is one of the oldest fire departments in the United States.

Notable Fires
 Chinatown Fire of 1887
The suspicious fire began in the Chinese quarter of San Jose. The cause of the fire was never determined. To this day, many believe that racial tensions and anti-Asian sentiment led to the fire being intentionally set. Chinatown's structures were constructed mainly of wood, and the fire devastated the entire neighborhood which burnt to the ground. Because of the 1887 fire, Chinatown never fully rebuilt itself and its absence from the city can still be seen to this day. A plaque memorializing the fire can be found on the Fairmont Hotel near Plaza de Cesar Chavez in downtown San Jose.

 Santana Row Fire of 2002
The construction of Santana Row, an upscale shopping, housing, dining and entertainment complex, faced a major setback in 2002 when an 11-alarm fire (5-alarm within SJFD) went ablaze. The fire took several fire companies to put out, and the effort immediately became defensive as the San Jose firefighters turned their attention towards protecting surrounding homes and businesses from flying embers. The Santana Row Fire was the biggest fire in the history of the city.

 Donner-Houghton House Fire
In the early morning of July 17, 2007, a suspicious fire consumed the historic landmark located at 156 E. St. John Street in San Jose which once housed early San Jose Mayor Sherman Houghton and his wife, Donner Party survivor Eliza Donner Houghton. The San Jose Police Department was the first on the scene to evacuate squatters who took shelter in the historic house. The four-alarm fire left the historic house charred and irreparable, and the city decided to slowly demolish the building to ensure public safety and to also allow fire investigators to determine the cause of the incident. The city tried to salvage parts of the house in an effort to save as much history as possible. After investigation, it was believed that the fire was started by squatters who lived in or around the vacant house. The squatters often started small fires to stay warm and to cook meals. Mattresses and chairs were found on the property, indicating their occupancy. The city of San Jose faced criticism for allowing the historic house to be vacant for so long, allowing unwanted squatters to break in and seek quarters inside unsafe living conditions.

Fallen Firefighters

References

External links 

 
 San Jose Fire Museum
 Craig Allyn Rose SJFD Photography
 San Jose Firefighter's IAFF Local 230 Website
 Unofficial Fire Station and Apparatus Website
 SJFD News and Info Twitter

Fire departments in California
Government of San Jose, California
Organizations based in San Jose, California
1854 establishments in California
Government agencies established in 1854